Phillip Sjøen (born 24 December 1995) is a Norwegian ski jumper.

He was born in Oslo, but resides in Fagerstrand.

Sjøen competed in the 2015 World Cup season.

He was selected to represent Norway at the FIS Nordic World Ski Championships 2015 in Falun.

References

External links 
 

1995 births
Living people
People from Nesodden
Norwegian male ski jumpers
Sportspeople from Viken (county)